The Roman Catholic Diocese of Babahoyo is a diocese located in the city of Babahoyo in the Ecclesiastical province of Guayaquil in Ecuador.

Ordinaries
Apostolic Administrator
Adolfo Maria Astudillo Morales (13 Aug 1948 – 1957), never consecrated bishop
Victor Garaygordóbil Berrizbeitia (1957 – 29 Nov 1963); see below
Prelate of Los Rios
Victor Garaygordóbil Berrizbeitia (29 Nov 1963 – 12 May 1982); consecrated bishop at this time; see above
Jesús Ramón Martínez de Ezquerecocha Suso (28 Jun 1984 – 22 Aug 1994); see below
Bishops of Babahoyo
Jesús Ramón Martínez de Ezquerecocha Suso (22 Aug 1994 – 27 Mar 2008); see above
Fausto Trávez Trávez, O.F.M. (27 Mar 2008 – 11 September 2010), appointed Archbishop of Quito
Marco Pérez Caicedo (10 February 2012 - 20 June 2016), appointed Archbishop of Cuenca
Skiper Bladimir Yáñez Calvachi (27 Mar 2018 - )

See also
Roman Catholicism in Ecuador

Sources
 GCatholic.org
 Catholic Hierarchy

Roman Catholic dioceses in Ecuador
Roman Catholic Ecclesiastical Province of Guayaquil
Christian organizations established in 1948
Roman Catholic dioceses and prelatures established in the 20th century
1948 establishments in Ecuador
Babahoyo